Liu Qizhen (born 17 September 1995) is a Chinese athlete specialising in the javelin throw. He won a silver medal at the 2018 Asian Games.

His personal best in the event is 82.22 metres set in Jakarta in 2018.

International competitions

References

1995 births
Living people
Chinese male javelin throwers
Athletes (track and field) at the 2018 Asian Games
Asian Games medalists in athletics (track and field)
Asian Games silver medalists for China
Medalists at the 2018 Asian Games
21st-century Chinese people